Bailey's Bird is an Australian TV series which was filmed in Asia. It was about a pilot and his son operating a charter operation in South East Asia.

Episodes
Hijack
Friend or Foe
A Funny Kind of Hero
The Old Monk
Outposts of Empire
The Search
Archeologist
Gift Horse
The Fishermen
The Chinese Coffin
Double Trouble
Open and Shut
Faded Tiger
Burning Bright
Blow the Man Down
A Man of Property
The Birthday Present
When the Band Begins to Play
Ghost with Gold Bangles
The Binatang Man
Bailey's Big Deal
Garland of Tears
The Otter Man
The Man from Mars
May Day
Touchdown

References

External links
Bailey's Bird at IMDb

Seven Network original programming
1979 Australian television series debuts